Flame maple (tiger maple), also known as flamed maple, curly maple, ripple maple, fiddleback or tiger stripe, is a feature of maple in which the growth of the wood fibers is distorted in an undulating chatoyant pattern, producing wavy lines known as "flames". This effect is often mistakenly said to be part of the grain of the wood; it is more accurately called "figure", as the distortion is perpendicular to the grain direction. Prized for its beautiful appearance, it is used frequently in the manufacturing of fine furniture and musical instruments, such as violins, guitars, and bassoons.

During the westward expansion of early settlers and explorers into the lands west of the Appalachian Mountains, curly maple was often used for making the stocks used on Kentucky rifles.

Usage in guitars

Popularization

Flame maple is especially popular in guitars, and has been for decades. Generally, the process includes cutting the maple to shape, forming it if necessary through mold-warping and applying a clear coat or lacquer to protect the finish, and ensure the wood holds its shape.

Controversy

Among guitar communities, one debate always present is that of tonality. This is the debate on how much or how little the instrument's material affects its sound. While this is a massive debate in itself, flame maple is a hardwood which is generally regarded to produce a bright, shimmering sound, due to its rigidity and reflection against sound waves. This effect is generally noticeable in acoustic flame-maple guitars, but arguably insignificant in electric guitars. Additionally, the effects of clear-coating or applying nitro to a flame maple finish are also up for debate.

Variations

According to the Beauty Of The Burst by Yasuhiko Watanabe, the figures seen on the sunburst Les Paul are categorized into 8 types: 6 types of flame maple (Curly, Ribbon curly, Flame, Tiger stripe, Fiddleback, Pin stripe), and 2 other types (Blister and Bird's eye). Note that usually the last two types are not considered as the flame maple variations, along with the quilt maple.

Figures on 
6 types of flame maple wood

Other types of figure maple wood (for comparison)

See also

Quilt maple
Birdseye maple

Notes

Maple
Wood